Triumph Tiger is a name used by a number of former motorcycles historically made by the British company Triumph Engineering and more-recent models by its modern successor, Triumph Motorcycles Ltd.

Current models:

 Triumph Tiger Sport 660, produced since 2022

Triumph Tiger 900 (2020), produced since 2020
Triumph Tiger Explorer, produced since 2012

Previous models made by Triumph Motorcycles Ltd since 1993:
Triumph Tiger 800, produced since 2010
Triumph Tiger 1050, produced since 2007
Triumph Tiger 900 (T400), produced between 1993 and 1998
Triumph Tiger 955i, produced between 2001 and 2006

Earlier models made by Triumph Engineering prior to 1982:
Triumph Tiger 80, produced between 1937 and 1939
Triumph Tiger 100, produced between 1939 and 1940; and between 1946 and 1973
Triumph Tiger T110, produced between 1953 and 1961
Triumph Tiger Cub, produced between 1956 and 1968
Triumph Tiger Daytona, produced between 1967 and 1974
Triumph TR7 Tiger, produced between 1973 and 1980
Triumph Tiger Trail, produced between 1981 and 1982

Tiger